The second season of Objetivo Fama began in 2005. This season the judges are Roberto Sueiro, Hilda Ramos, and Fernando Allende. The show was hosted by Mexican actor/singer Victor Noriega and Puerto Rican celebrity Yizette Cifredo.

Auditions

Final Cutdown
Out of each audition, a group of semi-finalists were selected. This was the first time that international contestants participated in the contest.

The 20 selected contestants were:

* Age was taken at the beginning of the contest (2007)

Controversies
Some controversies that surfaced during the season.
 During the show, contestant Carlos Rubén Salazar fell in love with one of the dancers of the shows. He was disqualified for going outside the studio/house at night without permission to meet her. They married shortly afterwards and, as of 2008 are still together. 
 Shortly after winning, several pornographic pictures of Anaís surfaced on the Internet. She admitted to having posed to the pictures several years before the show in the Dominican Republic and apologized for them.

After the Show
 Season winner Anaís has released two albums: Así Soy Yo (2006) and Con Todo Mi Corazón (2007). The former was nominated for a Latin Grammy. She also recorded "Arriba, Arriba", the theme song for the 2006 FIFA World Cup together with Pablo Montero, Mariana Seoane, and Ana Bárbara.
 First finalist Azucena Salazar and her brother, Carlos Rubén, have been performing with their father as Los Salazar, a mariachi group. They even performed at the White House during George W. Bush's presidency. 
 Jayro Rosado released an album titled Melódico in 2006.
 Estéban Nuñez released an album, and has also been acting in local plays.
 Rodolfo Castera served as host of shows and events. Since 2006, he has been acting in soap operas.
 Rosangela Abreu recorded a song with Salsa singer Gilberto Santa Rosa. She also participated in the second season of Latin American Idol where she finished in third place.
 Tairon Aguilera has dedicated himself to songwriting, composing songs for some contestants of the show.
 Emilio Acevedo joined the group Zone D' Tambora, produced by merengue singer Elvis Crespo. After that, they changed their name to AreaNova.
 Wenceslao Navarro has continued to work with his former band and released an album with them.
 In early 2007, the husband of Carmen Rivera was killed when he apparently intervened in a bar fight in Puerto Rico.
 Darla Delgado appeared in subsequent seasons of the show as a dancer. She also participated in the fifth season of Nuestra Belleza Latina which was held in 2011.

References

External links
 Objetivo Fama Official Page

Objetivo Fama